was a Japanese philosopher and a practitioner and teacher of aikido and Seitai.

Tsuda was born in Japanese-ruled Korea. When he was 16 years old, he defied his father, who wished for his eldest son to remain home and manage his family's estate. He left his family home and begin wandering, searching for new philosophies that would free his mind.

Having reconciled with his father, in 1934 he went to France, where he studied with Marcel Granet and Marcel Mauss until 1940, when he went back Japan: he studied Noh with Hosada, Seitai with  Haruchika Noguchi and aikido with  Morihei Ueshiba.

In 1970 Itsuo Tsuda came back to Europe to disseminate the regenerative movement (or katsugen undō 活元運動, かつげんうんどう, a basic Seitai practice) and his ideas on Ki. In 1973 he published his first book, "Le Non-Faire" while waiting to open his first dōjō, in Paris, L'Ecole de la Respiration (also the title of his series of books).

He died in Paris in 1984, but his practical philosophy is left in his work and his books and taught in several European "School of Breathing" dōjōs.

Bibliography
All books available from Guy Trédaniel Editeur
 Le Non Faire (1973)
 La Voie du Dépouillement (1975)
 La Science du Particulier (1976)
 Un (1978)
 Le Dialogue du Silence (1979)
 Le Triangle Instable (1980)
 Même si je ne pense pas, je suis (1981)
 La Voie des Dieux (1982)
 Face à la Science (1983)
 Coeur de ciel pur(2015)

 The Not Doing (1984, English translation of vol. 1 )
 The Non Doing (2014, New English translation of vol. 1) book available from Yume Editions
 The Path of Less (2014, English translation of vol. 2) book available from Yume Editions
 The Science of the Particular  (2015, English translation of vol. 3) book available from Yume Editions

References

External links
Ecole de la Respiration Tsuda's original dōjō in Paris where he taught Aikido and Seitai.
 École Itsuo Tsuda, dōjō in France : Paris, Toulouse, Le Mas d'Azil ; in Italy : Milano and Ancona ; in the Netherlands : Amsterdam.
 , video of Tsuda explaining his teaching followed by an Aikido demonstration: Tsuda's "pratique solitaire" (breathing practices including funa-kogi undo 船漕ぎ運動　ふなこぎうんどう), kiai and randori.
 , includes photos of Tsuda with Aikido founder Ueshiba and Seitai founder Noguchi.
 Guy Trédaniel Editeur Le Courrier du Livre
 Yume editions : english and italian editor
 Seitai Inteligencia Vital  Laura López Coto (Books and Seitai Divulgation)

1914 births
1984 deaths
Japanese aikidoka
Japanese male writers
Japanese philosophers
Traditional Japanese medicine
20th-century Japanese philosophers